is a 1991 futuristic side-scrolling beat 'em up originally developed and published by Capcom as an arcade video game, and later ported to several other platforms. It was the seventeenth game produced for the company's CP System hardware. The game stars the titular superhero who was originally conceived as a fictional spokesman used by Capcom USA in the company's console games during the late 1980s. On September 13, 2018, Capcom announced Capcom Beat 'Em Up Bundle with Captain Commando being one of seven titles and released digitally for Nintendo Switch, PlayStation 4, Xbox One, and Windows on September 18, 2018.

Plot
The game is set in a futuristic version of Metro City, the setting of Capcom's other beat 'em up, Final Fight, and features several loose ties with the characters and settings from that game. The year is 2026. The world is filled with crime. Captain Commando and his three faithful Commando Companions rise up to erase this crime from Planet Earth and from all the Galaxy. But the futuristic criminals they have to fight are endowed with a secret, hidden, evil power. Many of them are Super Criminals, with ability beyond that of ordinary mortals. The leader of all Super Criminals is Scumocide (known as Genocide in Japan).

Characters

Commando Team

He is both the team leader and the team founder. Besides his powerful mind and strong body, he also uses his "Energy Gloves," which can shoot mighty bolts of fire and electricity. His killer technique is the "Captain Corridor". Striking the ground with his Energy Gloves causes an electric shock which kills everyone around him. Captain Commando's dash attacks are "Captain Cannon" (also known as "Captain Fire") which torches the enemy with a blast of flame and "Captain Kick" which can hit several enemies at once on the ground or in the air. Captain Commando also can grab his opponent and kick their stomach or throw their whole body. Other things he uses are the "Captain Goggles" which help him identify a criminal's face at a distance of 2 km, by comparing with data base, the "Captain Protector" which is made of super-tough material called "Captanium" and stands up to trillion degree heat, the "Captain Gauntlet" which multiplies Captain's power 48 times making it easy for him to smash a thick iron plate and the "Captain Boots" which make it possible for him to take a 100-meter fall without injuries or damage to the boots.

The Mummy Commando is a mummy-like alien from outer space. As weapons he uses sub-sonic knives that melt any enemy he hits. His killer technique is the "Spinning Attack". Spinning around like a top, his bandages lash his enemies like whips. Mack's dash attacks are "Double Trouble" which sticks his enemy with both knives and "Sky Assault" which is an airborne version of Double Trouble. Mack also can grab his enemy and either stick or throw them. Other things he has are the "Captain Cap" which is a souvenir from the first meeting with Captain Commando, the "Genetic Bandage" which is his life-sustaining equipment for survival on Earth, the "Genetic Knife" which melts all matter and the "Gravity Controllers" which are his pair of shoes that adjust the gravitational pull to where it is best for the battles. Mack's English name comes from the Bertolt Brecht song of the same title.

The Ninja Commando is a highly trained ninja and successor to Bushin-ryu Ninpo, a fighting style of ninjutsu that was also inherited by Guy from Final Fight. His razor-sharp sword is capable of cutting an opponent in two. His killer technique is his "Smoke Bomb". After creating a smoke screen around his body, the smoke explodes, killing his enemies that are adjacent. Ginzu's dash attacks are "Iaizuki" which pierces several enemies at once and "Flying Katana" which cuts the enemies from above while jumping. Ginzu can grab his opponents and either kick their stomach or do a shoulder throw or overhead throw. Other things he is equipped with are his "Ninja Eyes" which can help him find enemies 500 meters ahead in pitch dark, his "Servant Sword" serves no one but him, is named "Lightning Light" and cuts things at atomic levels and his "Ninja Suit" which is tougher than iron and softer than silk. He is the only character who is able to throw shurikens at his opponents.

The Baby Commando is a super genius infant who fights using a robot of his own design. His robot is both strong and quick. His killer technique is his "Knee Rocket" which launches a missile from the robot's knee which are constantly manufactured within the robot. Baby Head's dash attacks are "Rolling Punch" which is a strong punch that spins like a drill and "Elbow Smash" which crushes the enemy under an elbow blow coming off a jump. Baby Head can grab his enemies and do either a knee kick, a "Pile-driver" or a "Fling-away". Other features he uses are the "Talking Machine" which resembles a baby pacifier and allows him to speak the 3 million languages of the cosmos, the "Stable Cradle" which keeps the robot from rocking, no matter how far it is tilted, the "Silverfist Vehicle" which has 12,000 horsepower, 582 kilograms (1280.4 pounds) of bodyweight and mounts fuzzy-logic control, the "Missile Launcher" which is a missile production facility built inside the leg, as well as in the Silvervest Vehicle and is nicknamed by Baby Head's friends "Baby Carriage" and the "Jet Hover" which is used for high-speed position shifting.

Gameplay

Captain Commando follows the same gameplay established in Capcom's previous beat-'em-up Final Fight. The arcade version allows up to two, three, or even four players simultaneously depending on the game's settings. The player can select between any of the four "commandos" (Mack, Captain, Ginzu, or Baby-Head) as their character, with each player controlling a different character. The player's objective as usual is to move towards the end of each stage, defeat every adversary who gets in their way while avoiding any traps that they may throw at the player's way before eventually fighting the boss awaiting at the final area of each stage. The game consists of a total of nine stages.

The control configuration is exactly like Final Fight, with an eight-way joystick for moving the character left or right, as well as towards or away from the background, along with two action buttons for attacking and jumping. The player can perform numerous combinations of attacks while standing or jumping, including grabbing the enemy, as well as a special attack by pressing the attack and jump simultaneously that will drain a portion of the player's vitality. An addition to the controls is the ability to dash by pushing the joystick left or right twice. The player can perform a running attack or even a running jump attack.

Like in Final Fight, the player can pick up health-restoring food items hidden inside barrels and other destructible objects to restore their vitality, as well as other bonus items to increase their score. Weapons also can be picked up, such as three different types of firearms, as well as shurikens that can only be used by Ginzu. Players also can ride certain robots by dismounting their riders and then jumping over the robot. The robots have their own vitality gauge and if they sustain enough damage, they will be destroyed. There are three types of robots in the game: a punching robot, a flame-throwing robot, and a freezing robot. Unlike Final Fight, weapons can be carried when the player makes the transition to a new area until the stage is completed.

Development

The origin of Captain Commando as a character predates his appearance in his self-titled game, in the packaging and manuals of many of Capcom's earlier titles for the Nintendo Entertainment System and Commodore 64 in North America released between 1986 and 1989. All of Capcom's games released for the NES between 1986 and 1988 (1942, Commando, Ghosts 'n Goblins, Mega Man, Trojan, Section Z and Gun Smoke) were released as part of the "Captain Commando Challenge Series" and featured a drawing of the Captain on the back of the packaging, which depicted him as a "futuristic" space hero wielding a raygun on each hand and two large medallions around his neck with the letter "C" engraved on each. Each game's instruction manual also featured a "Special Message" from the Captain addressed to the owner of the game, congratulating the player for purchasing one of Capcom's products. Additionally, the instruction manual for Section Z has the otherwise nameless player character uniting with Captain Commando himself, although it is unclear if that means they both control the spacesuit or if Captain Commando is a separate character.

A revised version of the Captain Commando character appeared again in Capcom's NES lineup in 1989 (Strider, Mega Man 2, Willow, and Duck Tales). The artwork on the rear packaging of those games featured an illustration of Captain Commando wearing a pilot suit in front of a fighter jet, holding a helmet under his right arm, with an alien chimp sitting on his right shoulder and the Capcom logo in an airbrushed style above them. The text above the artwork featured a message from the Captain advising the reader to "look to (him) for up-to-date reports for all the exciting action games from Capcom", followed by the Captain's apparent handwritten signature.

Home versions and related releases
A Super Nintendo 16 Meg port was released in 1995. This port only allows up to two players, shows less on-screen enemies and lacks the mech-suit. It is also censored on several aspects.
A PlayStation port was released in Japan only on September 17, 1998, by New Inc. This port allows up to three players with the use of a multiplayer adapter (4 Players with Cheat / GameShark).
The original CPS game is included in emulated form in the compilations Capcom Classics Collection: Remixed for the PlayStation Portable, Capcom Classics Collection Volume 2 for the PlayStation 2 and Xbox, both released in 2006 and Capcom Beat 'Em Up Bundle for the PlayStation 4, Nintendo Switch, Xbox One and Microsoft Windows in 2018.
A Sega CD port for the game was planned, but was cancelled.
A 64DD version was announced but canceled.

Legacy
Captain Commando would return as a player character in the fighting game Marvel vs. Capcom in 1998, as one of the characters representing Capcom. The Captain has a transformation sequence prior to each match which depicts him in a suit (or in a cowboy outfit) before donning his superhero costume. His "Commando Strike" special move, as well as both of his Hyper Combos (the "Captain Sword" and the "Captain Storm"), has him summoning his "Commando Companions" to attack his opponent. The Captain's victory quotes consist of random Capcom trivia, while his ending in Marvel vs. Capcom is an homage to the ending in his original game. This incarnation of Captain Commando also appears in the sequel, Marvel vs. Capcom 2. Besides the Marvel vs. Capcom games, Captain Commando also appears in four other cross-over games: Capcom World 2, Namco × Capcom, Project X Zone 2 and the SNK vs. Capcom: Card Fighters Clash series. A two-volume manga was also published in Japan in 1994 in Gamest Comics, which was translated and published overseas by UDON.

Reception

In Japan, Game Machine listed Captain Commando on their December 1, 1991 issue as being the most-successful table arcade unit of the month, outperforming titles such as Street Fighter II: The World Warrior and WWF WrestleFest.

The November 1991 issue of Sinclair User gave it the shared award for "Games Most Likely To Save The Universe" as one of the best superhero games, along with Spider-Man: The Video Game and Captain America and The Avengers.

On release, Famicom Tsūshin scored the Super Famicom version of the game a 21 out of 40. In 2013, the arcade original game was ranked as the 21st top beat 'em up video game of all time by Heavy.com. In 2018, Complex rated Captain Commando 79th on their "The Best Super Nintendo Games of All Time".

Notes

References

External links

Captain Commando at arcade-history

1991 video games
Arcade video games
CP System games
Capcom beat 'em ups
Capcom Power System Changer games
Cancelled 64DD games
Cooperative video games
Video games about ninja
PlayStation (console) games
Science fiction video games
Side-scrolling beat 'em ups
Super Nintendo Entertainment System games
Superhero video games
Censored video games
Video games adapted into comics
Video games developed in Japan
Video games set in the 2020s